Anthony Joshua vs Éric Molina was a heavyweight professional boxing match contested between undefeated IBF champion Anthony Joshua, and the IBF's number 15 ranked contender and former world title challenger, Éric Molina. The bout took place on 10 December 2016 at the Manchester Arena in Manchester, England. Joshua defeated Molina, retaining his heavyweight title via third-round technical knockout (TKO).

Background
Following Joshua's win over Dominic Breazeale on 25 June, a seventh-round technical knockout (TKO) to retain his IBF heavyweight title, the IBF ordered Joshua to fight undefeated mandatory challenger, Joseph Parker, by 9 January 2017. Following unified heavyweight champion Tyson Fury's withdrawal from a scheduled rematch with Wladimir Klitschko, Hearn revealed on Twitter in late September that he had contacted team Klitschko for a potential fight. On 16 October it was reported that a deal with Klitschko was almost finalised, with the WBA and WBO titles potentially being on the line after Fury vacated the titles days earlier. A week later, it was reported that Klitschko had sustained an injury in training, scuttling plans of a potential fight. After Joseph Parker had agreed to fight Andy Ruiz Jr for the vacant WBO title, relinquishing his IBF mandatory position, the three names in the mix for Joshua's opponent were Éric Molina, David Price and Bryant Jennings. In November, it was officially announced that Joshua would make the second defence of his title against the IBF's number 15 ranked contender and former world title challenger, Éric Molina, with the fight to be televised live on Sky Sports Box Office in the UK and Showtime in the US, on 10 December at the Manchester Arena.

The Fight

The opener saw little action, with the highlight being a left hook from Joshua in the final seconds of a round which the champion comfortably won on the scorecards. The second round saw much of the same; Molina cautiously backing up as Joshua stalked the American around the ring, with the highlight again coming from the champion–a left uppercut that momentarily stunned Molina. Joshua began the third round with more intensity, throwing combination punches as Molina continued to remain on the back foot. At the halfway point, Joshua landed a powerful straight right hand to drop Molina to the canvas. The challenger beat the referee's count of ten, only for Joshua to pounce on the American with a flurry of punches culminating in a left hook to force the referee to call a halt to the fight. Following Joshua's win, promoter Eddie Hearn brought Wladimir Klitschko into the ring to announce Klitschko as Joshua's next opponent, with the fight scheduled for 29 April 2017 at the Wembley Stadium in London.

Fight card

See also
List of IBF heavyweight champions

References

2016 in boxing
2016 in British sport
December 2016 sports events in the United Kingdom
2010s in Manchester
International sports competitions in Manchester
International Boxing Federation heavyweight championship matches
Pay-per-view boxing matches
Boxing matches involving Anthony Joshua